Euro league may refer to:
 EuroLeague, professional men's basketball league
 EuroLeague Women, professional women's basketball league
 Euroleague for Life Sciences (ELLS) association of European universities in the area of life sciences 
 Euro Hockey League (field hockey)
 European Hockey League (ice hockey)
 Euro Beach Soccer League
 Euro League (arcade game) (Association football)

See also
 European league (disambiguation)
 UEFA Europa League (association football)
 FIBA Europe League (basketball)
 NFL Europe League (gridiron football)